The Hollowmen is an Australian television comedy series set in the offices of the Central Policy Unit, a fictional political advisory unit personally set up by the Prime Minister to help him get re-elected. Their brief is long-term vision; to stop worrying about tomorrow's headlines, and focus on next week's.

The Hollowmen was first broadcast on Wednesday, 9 July 2008, on ABC1. Each series comprises six half-hour episodes. On the eve of the first episode's national premiere, the series was approved by the ABC for a second series. The second series was screened right after the first, beginning on 13 September 2008.

The comedy-drama satire is produced by Working Dog Productions, which was also responsible for Frontline, The Panel, Thank God You're Here and Utopia. The music used during the opening credits is an edited instrumental excerpt of the 1987 song "North by North" by New Zealand band The Bats. A special one-off presentation of The Hollowmen was created by Working Dog and played at Parliament House in Canberra on 11 March 2009, in support of the ABC's funding bid for 2009–12.

Cast

Main
 Rob Sitch as Tony, the Prime Minister's Principal Private Secretary
 Lachy Hulme as David 'Murph' Murphy, Senior Political Advisor and Director of the Central Policy Unit
 Merrick Watts as Nick, Senior Political Advisor
 Neil Melville as Ian, the Prime Minister's Chief of Staff
David James as Phillip, Secretary of the Department of the Prime Minister and Cabinet
 Stephen Hall as Warren, Departmental Under-Secretary
 Jacquie Brennan as Mel, Senior Media Advisor
 Santo Cilauro as Theo Tsolakis, Head of Market Research
 Nicola Parry as Holly, Unit Office Manager

Supporting
 Rob Carlton as Kenny Pratt, advisor to the previous PM
 Graeme Blundell as Geoff, Party Director
  Leonie Hemsworth as Dianne, Prime Minister's Secretary
  Sacha Joseph as Vanmathy, Unit Office
  Ben Chisholm as Josh, Unit Office
  Sarah Arthur Young as Sarah, Unit Office Receptionist
  Phil Pollard as Phil, Prime Minister's Security Guard

The Prime Minister is an unseen character.

Episodes

Series overview

Series 1 (2008)

Series 2 (2008)

Episode ratings
The first season premiered at 9:30 pm on Wednesday 9 July 2008. After episode 5, it was removed from schedule due to the 2008 Beijing Olympics. The season finale aired at 9:00 pm on Wednesday 27 August.

Production 

It was partially inspired by Cilauro's 1996 documentary The Campaign about Paul Keating's failed election. They initially wanted to make a series about an independent politician, but decided that such people didn't really hold much power and wanted the explore the idea that politics is run like a corporation.

Reception

Debi Enker from the Sydney Morning Herald described the first episode of The Hollowmen as using "low-key style [and] sandpaper-dry wit" to show the hollowness of the political newscycle. 

Opposition leader Tony Abbott used its premiere to criticise the government, claiming that the "Howard government didn't work like that", and that the series would not have made sense under a Liberal government.

It won the 2009 Logie for Most Outstanding Comedy Program.

Accuracy 
In 2008 the Sydney Morning Herald interviewed political advisors about the accuracy of the show. Political advisors noted that the characters were more cynical and amoral than them and their colleagues, and played to people's prejudices, but a few conceded that they knew people like Rob Sitch's character, Tony. They found that pollsters were portrayed as having too much power in the show, and noted that senior public servants were not as innocent as they were portrayed.

In contrast they found larger themes of media driven policies, "arse-covering" and superficial treatment of complex issues were "remarkably accurate", noting that the Melbourne 2am Lockout laws were a good example.

Home media
Series 1 and 2 of The Hollowmen is available on DVD as a three disc box set.

See also
 List of Australian television series
 List of Australian Broadcasting Corporation programs
 The Thick of It
 The Hollow Men
 Frontline
 The West Wing
 Yes, Minister
 Absolute Power
 K Street
 Utopia

References

External links
The Hollowmen official website (ABC TV)

2008 Australian television series debuts
2000s Australian comedy television series
Australian political comedy television series
Australian Broadcasting Corporation original programming
Logie Award for Most Outstanding Comedy Program winners
Television shows set in Australian Capital Territory